Dhaka-11 is a constituency represented in the Jatiya Sangsad (National Parliament) of Bangladesh since 2014 by AKM Rahmatullah of the Awami League.

Boundaries 
The constituency encompasses Dhaka North City Corporation wards 21 through 23, and four union parishads of Badda Thana: Badda, Beraid, Vatara and Satarkul.

History 
The constituency was created for the first general elections in newly independent Bangladesh, held in 1973.

Ahead of the 2008 general election, the Election Commission redrew constituency boundaries to reflect population changes revealed by the 2001 Bangladesh census. The 2008 redistricting added 7 new seats to the Dhaka metropolitan area, increasing the number of constituencies in the capital from 8 to 15, and altered the boundaries of the constituency.

Members of Parliament

Elections

Elections in the 2010s 
AKM Rahmatullah was elected unopposed in the 2014 general election after opposition parties withdrew their candidacies in a boycott of the election.

Elections in the 2000s

Elections in the 1990s 

Harun Rashid Mollah died in November 1992. Syed Muhammad Moshin, of the BNP, was elected in a February 1993 by-election.

References

External links
 

Parliamentary constituencies in Bangladesh
Dhaka District